Glyphipterix regula is a species of sedge moth in the genus Glyphipterix. It was described by Alexey Diakonoff in 1976. It is found on the Kuril Islands.

References

Moths described in 1976
Glyphipterigidae
Moths of Japan